This is a list of Marathi (Indian Marathi-language) films that are scheduled to release or released in 2021.

January - June

July - December

References 

2021
2021 in Indian cinema
 
Marathi